Megachile incisa is a species of bee in the family Megachilidae. It was described by Smith in 1858.

References

Incisa
Insects described in 1858